Lanfranconi Bridge (previously Most mládeže or Youth Bridge) is a concrete motorway bridge in Bratislava, Slovakia, located on the D2 motorway. It was built in 1985–1991, with its right half opened in 1990 and the rest in 1992. It is 766 m long (1134 m with access viaducts), and has a 30 m wide four-lane motorway. There are lanes for cyclists and pedestrians as well. It crosses the Danube.

External links
 
  

Bridges in Bratislava
Bridges over the Danube
Bridges completed in 1991
Transport in Bratislava
1991 establishments in Slovakia
20th-century architecture in Slovakia